Hansje Bunschoten (3 May 1958 – 1 October 2017) was a freestyle swimmer from the Netherlands, who competed for her native country at the 1972 Summer Olympics in Munich, West Germany. As a member of the Dutch Relay Teams she finished in fifth place, both in the 4 × 100 m medley and the 4 × 100 m freestyle.

References

1958 births
2017 deaths
Dutch female freestyle swimmers
Olympic swimmers of the Netherlands
Swimmers at the 1972 Summer Olympics
Sportspeople from Hilversum
Dutch television presenters
Dutch women television presenters
20th-century Dutch women